Mike Riley (January 5, 1904 – September 2, 1984) was an American jazz trombonist and songwriter. He is best known for co-writing the 1935 song "The Music Goes Round and Round", one of the biggest hits of that year.

Career
Riley played both trumpet and trombone, and by 1927 was working in New York City, playing trumpet in Jimmy Durante's band at the Parody Club. He soon found work in several local bands as a trombonist, then co-led an ensemble with Eddie Farley, with whom he held a regular gig at the Onyx Club and wrote several songs including "The Music Goes Round and Round". He worked in New York and regionally through the 1940s, then worked in Chicago in the 1950s. Riley led a band which toured North America later in the 1950s and 1960s.

Personal life 
He died in Redondo Beach, California, in 1984.

References

Further reading
[ Mike Riley] at Allmusic

1904 births
1984 deaths
American jazz trombonists
Male trombonists
20th-century American musicians
20th-century trombonists
20th-century American male musicians
American male jazz musicians